The Women's 25 metre pistol event at the 2016 Olympic Games took place on 9 August 2016 at the National Shooting Center.

The event consisted of three rounds: a qualifier, semifinal and a final. In the qualifier, each shooter fired 60 shots with a pistol at 25 metres distance. Scores for each shot were in increments of 1, with a maximum score of 10. The first 30 shots were in the precision stage, with series of 5 shots being shot within 5 minutes. The second set of 30 shots gave shooters 3 seconds to take each shot.

The medals were presented by René Fasel, IOC member, Switzerland and Susan Abbott, Council Member of the International Shooting Sport Federation.

Records
Prior to this competition, the existing world and Olympic records were as follows.

Qualification round

Semifinal

Final (medal matches)

References

External links

Shooting at the 2016 Summer Olympics
Olym
Women's events at the 2016 Summer Olympics